Mia is a surname. Notable people with the surname include:

 Abida Mia, Malawian politician
 Sidik Mia (1965–2021), Malawian businessman and politician

See also 
 Mia (given name)

Surnames
Surnames of African origin